The 1962 Holy Cross Crusaders football team was an American football team that represented the College of the Holy Cross as an independent during the 1962 NCAA University Division football season. Eddie Anderson returned for the 13th consecutive year as head coach, his 19th year overall. The team compiled a record of 6–4.

All home games were played at Fitton Field on the Holy Cross campus in Worcester, Massachusetts.

Schedule

Statistical leaders
Statistical leaders for the 1962 Crusaders included: 
 Rushing: Pat McCarthy, 454 yards and 12 touchdowns on 148 attempts
 Passing: Pat McCarthy, 1,267 yards, 85 completions and 8 touchdowns on 194 attempts
 Receiving: Al Snyder, 716 yards and 6 touchdowns on 41 receptions
 Scoring: Pat McCarthy, 80 points from 12 touchdowns and 4 two-point conversions
 Total offense: Pat McCarthy, 1,721 yards (1,267 passing, 454 rushing)
 All-purpose yards: Al Snyder, 1,116 yards (716 receiving, 237 rushing, 163 returning)

References

Holy Cross
Holy Cross Crusaders football seasons
Holy Cross Crusaders football